Although Kyrgyzstan’s mountains and lakes are an attractive tourist destination, the tourism industry has grown very slowly because it has received little investment. In the early 2000s, an average of about 450,000 tourists visited annually, mainly from countries of the former Soviet Union. In 2018, the British Backpacker Society ranked Kyrgyzstan as the fifth best adventure travel destination on earth, stating that the country was an adventure travel secret that is "bound to get out soon."

Lake Issyk-Kul and the Tian Shan mountains are relatively popular tourist destinations.

Cultural attractions
Kyrgyz culture is based on nomadic traditions that harken back to the days of the Mongol hordes. Although modern Kyrgyz people live mainly in houses or apartment buildings, in the summer time it is still possible to observe the native people living in a yurt with their herds of sheep, goats, horses, and occasionally even yaks. There are a number of yurt camps that cater to tourists in every oblast; some of the most notable (and remote) are in Tash Rabat, the "House of Stones" in Naryn oblast past Naryn City, and in Jeti-Ögüz ("Seven Bulls") Valley in Jeti-Oguz District near the city of Karakol on Lake Issyk-Kul.

Kyrgyz women produce a variety of handicrafts created out of felt, including slippers, bags, decorative panels, traditional hats known as "Kalpaks" and colorful carpets called "shyrdaks." These carpets are made in a variety of sizes, from foot-by-foot sized to several yards in length. Shyrdaks come in a wide variety of traditional patterns; the Kyrgyz favor brightly colored ones, often combining bright red and green. More subtly-hued shyrdaks, made for foreign customers, can be found in Bishkek, often for a slightly higher price than the more "traditional" carpets. Naryn oblast is widely considered the home of the best shyrdak makers in the country; there are several cooperatives there where it is possible to commission a work specially.

Eco-tourism
Currently there are several efforts to promote "eco-friendly" tourism in Kyrgyzstan. Helvetas, a Swiss cultural development organization, sponsored several projects of this sort, including "Shepard's Life," and "Community Based Tourism." The many tourist companies in Kyrgyzstan understand that "eco-" anything sounds very appealing to the many backpackers that come to their country, so they tend to use it to describe their organization, even if they do nothing to promote "low-impact" or "leave no trace" camping. However, the very nature of the type of tourists that are attracted to Kyrgyzstan dictates that most of the tourist attractions offered are aimed at enjoying the beauty that the local environment has to offer. In year 2010 Kyrgyzstan joined The Region Initiative (TRI) which is a Tri-regional Umbrella of Tourism related organisations. TRI is functioning as a link between three regions----South Asia, Central Asia and Eastern Europe which is also joined by Armenia, Bangladesh, India, Georgia, Kazakhstan, India, Pakistan, Nepal, Tajikistan, Russia, Sri Lanka, Turkey, Ukraine and Uzbekistan.

Tourist sites

The popular science magazine National Geographic named eight wild places in Kyrgyzstan that are recommended for tourists to visit. “In the cities of Kyrgyzstan there are many Soviet-style buildings, spacious markets and colorful mosques. However, outside of Bishkek and Osh you will see a miracle - high-mountain lakes, snow-capped peaks and walnut forests,” the publication writes. National Geographic has included several locations in its selection.

Ala Archa National Park - It is located 40 kilometers from Bishkek. One of the most famous natural areas in the country. From the Kyrgyz language, "ala-archa" is translated as "motley juniper" - this plant is used by the local population to protect housing from evil spirits.
Köl-Suu - In the highlands near the border with China there is a lake. To get there, you need four hours by car from Naryn, and then get on foot or on horseback.
Lenin Peak - Located on the border with Tajikistan. This seven-thousander is one of the most famous peaks in Kyrgyzstan. Experienced climbers try to conquer it every year.
Arslanbob - One of the largest walnut forests in the world. First interested settlers in the III century BC, and today attracts tourists from different countries.
Ala-Kul - Located in the snowy mountain range of Teskey Ala-Too at an altitude of 3532 meters. You can get there only on foot - it will take more than one day.
Tash Rabat - At one time, this historic building served as the main parking lot for merchants and caravans following the Great Silk Road. A caravanserai was built in a valley between the mountains of At-Bashi. Today, tourists can get here for a small fee. Nearby there are hiking trails leading to the lake and Chatyr-Kul Nature Reserve.
Skazka Canyon - Also known as Fairytale Canyon, this area is on the southern shore of Lake Issyk-Kul. The canyon was formed as a result of thousands of years of ice, water and wind erosion.
 Bokonbaevo - A small village on the coast of Issyk-Kul attracts tourists with preserved traditions. Here they will be shown hunting games with hunting birds or offered to ride a horse.

Visitor statistics
Most visitors arriving to Kyrgyzstan were from the following countries of nationality:

See also
 Visa policy of Kyrgyzstan
 Cuisine of Kyrgyzstan

References

External links

Kyrgyzstan on Globetrooper
The Region Initiative (TRI)
Alpinism, Trekking in Kyrgyzstan 
Mountain Tourism and Sustainability in Kyrgyzstan and Tajikistan: A Research Review
Eight most beautiful places in Kyrgyzstan named National Geographic
My 30 Day Backpacking Trip to Kyrgyzstan

 
Kyrgyzstan